A notch code is a set of notches or recesses cut into the edge of a piece of sheet film to provide a tactile way to identify the film brand, type, and processing chemistry  (e.g. black and white, color negative, or color reversal) in the dark.  It enables photographers to identify the emulsion side of the film when loading sheet film holders, and helps processing lab technicians avoid placing sheets in the wrong processor. After processing the notches serve as a permanent visual record of the same information. When the film is oriented vertically (portrait format), the notches are in the top edge near the upper right corner when the emulsion faces the viewer.

Code notches and ISO speeds for Kodak sheet films

Code notches and ISO speeds for Ilford sheet films

Code notches and ISO speeds for Fuji sheet films

Historic Notch Codes

Sources

 Note 31.3 of the RIT PhotoForum List FAQ File 
 Kodak Tech Pub F3
 Kodak Technical Publication P7-4A: Reference Data for Kodak Professional Photographic Products.
  More film notch codes.
 Kodak information on Plus-X Pan Professional with correct notch code  http://www.kodak.com/global/en/professional/support/techPubs/f8/f8.pdf

References

Photographic film markings